Euphorbia palustris, the marsh spurge or marsh euphorbia, is a species of flowering plant in the family Euphorbiaceae, native to marshland throughout much of mainland Europe and western Asia.

It was published and first described by Carl Linnaeus in his book, Species Plantarum on page 462 in 1753.

It prefers permanently moist conditions in full sun, hence the common name "marsh spurge" and the Latin specific epithet palustris, "of marshland". It is thought to be an ideal plant for gardening because it has a different colour for almost all of the seasons. 

Euphorbia palustris has gained the Royal Horticultural Society's Award of Garden Merit.

Like all euphorbias, all parts of the plant are toxic if ingested, and cut stems produce an irritant sticky sap.

References

External links

palustris
Plants described in 1753
Taxa named by Carl Linnaeus
Flora of Europe
Flora of Asia